Sofia Wännerdahl (born 3 December 1995) is a Swedish football defender who plays for Piteå IF in the Damallsvenskan.

Club career
Sofia Wännerdahl played at Borgeby FK in her youth years. In 2014, she joined IF Limhamn Bunkeflo.

References

1995 births
Living people
IF Limhamn Bunkeflo players
Swedish women's footballers
Women's association football defenders
Damallsvenskan players